W. B. Scott may refer to:

William Bell Scott (1811–1890), British poet and artist
William Bennett Scott Sr., newspaper publisher and civil rights advocate for African Americans
William Berryman Scott (1858–1947), American paleontologist

See also
William Scott (disambiguation)